The 1995 Campeonato Brasileiro Série A was the 39th edition of the Campeonato Brasileiro Série A.

Overview
It was contested by 24 teams, and Botafogo won the championship, the club's second Série A title in history.

Of the 24 participating teams, only two were relegated, Paysandu and União São João. Also only the first two teams from the Série B in 1995 would be qualified to the Série A in 1996. Fluminense, Palmeiras, Bragantino and Vasco da Gama all qualified to the Copa CONMEBOL, then the second major tournament of the continental zone, and predecessor of the present-day Copa Sudamericana.

The eventual champions, Botafogo, together with Corinthians and Grêmio, qualified to the Copa Libertadores of 1996, the major South American cup tournament. Corinthians qualified by winning the Copa do Brasil in 1995 and Grêmio for being the holders of the Copa Libertadores title.

First stage

Group A

Group B

Second stage

Group A

Group B

Final standings

Final stage

* Botafogo and Santos classified to Final by the advantage of prior results.

Top scorers

References

1995
1!